The two German steam locomotives of DB Class 78.10, operated by the Deutsche Bundesbahn, were rebuilds based on two Prussian P 8 engines which were converted by the firm of Krauss-Maffei and the Minden repair shop. The aim was to improve the acceleration performance of the vehicles, especially for duties on suburban lines and city (Stadtbahn) lines.

The running gear, drive and boilers of both locomotives, which originally had the running numbers 38 2919 and 38 2990, remained virtually unchanged. The driver's cab was redesigned. A short tender was added which was coupled to the engine with a shaft and improved the riding qualities when running in reverse. The locomotives were classed as tank engines and initially worked in the Munich area, later in Augsburg and finally by Lake Constance. They remained the only ones of their type and were retired as early as 1961.

Neither of the two DB Class 78.10 locomotives has been preserved.

References

78.10
078.10
4-6-4T locomotives
Krauss-Maffei locomotives
Railway locomotives introduced in 1951
Passenger locomotives
Scrapped locomotives
Standard gauge locomotives of Germany
2′C2′ h2t locomotives